The 1995 Central Asian Games also known as the I Central Asian Games were held in Tashkent, Uzbekistan in 1995.

Participating nations 
  Kazakhstan (171)
  Kyrgyzstan
  Tajikistan
  Turkmenistan
  Uzbekistan

Sports

Medal table

References 

Central Asian Games
Central Asian Games, 1995
Sport in Tashkent
C
1995 in Asian sport
International sports competitions hosted by Uzbekistan
Multi-sport events in Uzbekistan
20th century in Tashkent